Scalptia aliguayensis is a species of sea snail, a marine gastropod mollusk in the family Cancellariidae, the nutmeg snails.

Description

Distribution
This marine species occurs off the Philippines.

References

 Verhecken A. (2008) Cancellariidae (Neogastropoda: Cancellarioidea) from the Philippines: Description of new species, and a range extension. Visaya 2(3): 7-17.
 Verhecken A. (2008). Cancellariidae. Pp. 816-825, in G.T. Poppe (ed.), Philippine marine mollusks, volume 2. Hackenheim: CoonchBooks.

Cancellariidae
Gastropods described in 2008